Canal 7 (call sign LW 81 TV) is an television station broadcasting from Santiago del Estero, Argentina and carries programs from Telefe. Founded in 1962 and beginning operations, it was the second station in the country to start broadcasting in color (Canal 7 in Buenos Aires was the first). Currently, it shows most of the network's programs, aside from the weekend cartoons which are preempted as the station doesn't start weekend programming until noon. It also chooses not to show one or two primetime shows, instead showing local interest programs.

Local programming
Debate Abierto - talk show
Confidencias en Televisión - interviews
Por la Camiseta - sports
Santa Misa - religious
Pausa en Familia - religious

External links
Official website

Television stations in Argentina
Television channels and stations established in 1965